The Jack Bull is a 1999 American Western television film directed by John Badham and written by Dick Cusack, loosely inspired by Heinrich von Kleist's 1810 novel Michael Kohlhaas. It stars John Cusack, John Goodman, L. Q. Jones, Miranda Otto, and John C. McGinley, and aired on HBO on April 17, 1999. Much of the movie was filmed at the CL Ranch and the Heritage Park Historical Village in Calgary, Alberta.

Plot
In 1889 Wyoming Territory, Myrl Redding is a horse trader living with his wife Cora, son Cage, and some ranch hands. When Redding attempts to take his horses to a horse market in Casper, he discovers local wealthy landowner, Henry Ballard, has erected a tollbooth on the road to Casper, which goes through Ballard's property. Ballard, who disagrees with Redding regarding making Wyoming a state (which will restrict Ballard's commercial opportunities), charges Redding ten dollars to pass through his land. Unable to pay, Redding leaves two horses as collateral for payment along with a Native American ranch hand, Billy, to ensure the horses are not mistreated.

After selling the horses at Casper, Redding returns to Ballard's ranch to discover that the horses are malnourished and beaten, with Billy nowhere in sight. Redding vows that Ballard will pay to restore the horses' health, while Ballard refuses to pay anything. Redding approaches a local lawyer seeking to sue Ballard, however the lawyer is doubtful the local judge, Judge Wilkins, who is friends with Ballard, will do anything. Redding soon learns that Judge Wilkins has indeed thrown out the lawsuit, prompting his wife to attempt to meet the Attorney General, whose wife she is friends with, escorted by ranch hand Woody. During her visit, some of Ballard's men attack Woody and throw him in front of a horse carriage, which swerves to avoid him and ends up hitting and killing Cora. Redding, furious at the law's failure to do anything about the death of his wife and the loss of his horses, rallies a local militia of ranch owners and farmers and attacks Ballard’s home, sending him fleeing.

Ballard manages to plead his case to the Governor of Wyoming, who dispatches a sheriff to arrest Redding. Redding manages to ambush the sheriff's men and in the confusion one of Ballard's men is killed. Seeking to ease the escalating violence, the Governor of Wyoming offers Redding amnesty if he surrenders. Redding accepts but later sends a letter promising to support Billy's tribe against the United States, jeopardizing his amnesty agreement. He is subsequently charged and convicted of murder. Ballard, meanwhile, is brought to Court and ordered to restore the horses' health by a sympathetic judge, Joe B. Tolliver, who also orders Ballard imprisoned for two years. Nonetheless, Judge Tolliver is forced to sentence Redding to be executed following his conviction.

After saying goodbye to his son, Redding is hung and executed. Wyoming becomes a state, and Cage and Woody take the two healthy horses back to the Redding ranch.

Cast
 John Cusack as Myrl Redding
 John Goodman as Judge Joe B. Tolliver
 L. Q. Jones as Henry Ballard
 Miranda Otto as Cora Redding
 John C. McGinley as Woody
 Rodney A. Grant as Billy Redwood
 Kurt Fuller as Conrad
 Rex Linn as Shelby Dykes
 Drake Bell as Cage Redding
 Ken Pogue as Judge Wilkins
 Scott Wilson as The Governor
 Dick Cusack as Jury Foreman

Soundtrack
 Music by Lennie Niehaus
 "Ring Them Bells" – Bob Dylan

References

External links
 

1999 television films
1999 films
1999 Western (genre) films
1990s American films
1990s English-language films
American films about revenge
American Western (genre) television films
Films about capital punishment
Films about miscarriage of justice
Films based on German novels
Films based on novellas
Films based on Western (genre) novels
Films based on works by Heinrich von Kleist
Films directed by John Badham
Films scored by Lennie Niehaus
Films set in 1889
Films set in 1890
Films set on farms
Films set in Wyoming
Films shot in Calgary
HBO Films films
Television films based on books